Elections to Barrow-in-Furness Borough Council were held on 1 May 2003. One third of the council was up for election and the Labour party gained control of the council from no overall control.

After the election, the composition of the council was
Labour 21
Conservative 14
Independent 3

Election result

Ward results

References
2003 Barrow-in-Furness election result
Ward results

2003 English local elections
2003
2000s in Cumbria